U.S. Route 62 (US 62) is a signed north-south U.S. Highway in Pennsylvania, which runs diagonally southwest-northeast through the industrial northwestern part of the state. Although initial portions of the route opened in 1926 in other areas of the country, US 62 was not designated in the commonwealth until 1932. The highway connects the small cities of Sharon, Franklin, Oil City, and Warren to larger markets, such as Youngstown, Ohio and Buffalo, New York.

Route description

U.S. Route 62 enters Pennsylvania from Ohio as part of the Shenango Valley Freeway. Four lanes, winding, and with limited stop lights, the road, which was built in 1958, bypasses the city of Sharon. A business route is signed on the former path of the highway.  After passing through Sharon, the road reverts to two lane status, as it travels toward Mercer, the county seat of Mercer County.  Here, it briefly joins US 19 through the center of town. The road then turns sharply  toward a north-northeast alignment and features an interchange with Interstate 79.  After cutting through rural Mercer and Venango counties, US 62 reaches the twin industrial towns of Franklin and Oil City. In Franklin, the highway is briefly cosigned with US 322, as it passes through the west side of town. The road then joins PA 8 to form a four–lane riverfront connector between the two towns.  Immediately before entering Oil City, the roads split, with US 62 branching off to cross the Allegheny River over the Petroleum Street Bridge and serve the south side of town. After crossing this 1995 girder structure, which replaced a 1910 truss bridge, the highway remains four lanes until leaving the municipality.

The Allegheny River is only rarely out of sight as the highway winds its way through Venango and Forest Counties, crossing from the south bank to the north by way of the Hunter Station Bridge, an unusual 1934 truss design. It crosses the river a third time on the Tionesta Bridge, a 1961 girder structure that set the tone for 1980s–90s replacements of a series of historic bridges along the waterway. While traveling through Forest and into Warren County, the road is oriented in a north-south direction, which is reflected in its guide signs, despite the national route’s east-west direction. The route passes through the Allegheny Islands Wilderness, crosses the river again via the Irvine Bridge, and subsequently joins with US 6 via a trumpet interchange to form part of the freeway bypass of Warren, which was constructed in 1969. The routes divide near the city center, and US 62 follows a narrow path of city streets in the old city core before becoming a four–lane highway north of the town. The highway becomes a two–lane road again as it heads toward the New York boundary.

History
US 62 was designated in Pennsylvania in 1932, replacing PA 65 between the Ohio border near Sharon and Franklin, PA 8 between Franklin and Oil City, PA 57 between Oil City and Fryburg, and PA 66 between Fryburg and the New York border. Signs were installed by June 1 of that year.

Major intersections

See also

References

External links

Pennsylvania Highways: US 62
Pennsylvania Roads – US 62

Transportation in Forest County, Pennsylvania
Transportation in Mercer County, Pennsylvania
Transportation in Venango County, Pennsylvania
Transportation in Warren County, Pennsylvania
63
 Pennsylvania